The Boxwoods (also known as Rural Retreat) is a historic plantation house located near Madison, Rockingham County, North Carolina. It was built about 1815, and is a two-story, five bay, Federal style brick dwelling.  It has a small one-story, gabled frame addition.  It has pairs of brick exterior chimneys on each gable end and features a full-length one-story mid-19th century porch.

It was listed on the National Register of Historic Places in 1980.

References

Plantation houses in North Carolina
Houses on the National Register of Historic Places in North Carolina
Federal architecture in North Carolina
Houses completed in 1815
Houses in Rockingham County, North Carolina
National Register of Historic Places in Rockingham County, North Carolina